Profilicollis major is a species of acanthocephalan parasites of crustaceans in the genus Profilicollis.  It infects the Atlantic rock crab Cancer irroratu.

References

Polymorphidae
Animals described in 1942
Parasites of crustaceans